Julia A. Haller is an American ophthalmologist who is a Professor and Chair of the Department of Ophthalmology at Sidney Kimmel Medical College at Thomas Jefferson University. She also holds the William Tasman, M.D. Endowed Chair at Wills Eye Hospital in Philadelphia, where she is Ophthalmologist-in-Chief.

Education
Haller attended the Bryn Mawr School. She received her A.B. from Princeton University, magna cum laude. She received her medical training at Harvard Medical School, followed by an internship at Johns Hopkins and a fellowship in ocular pathology at Manhattan Eye, Ear and Throat Hospital. Her residency was at the Wilmer Eye Institute at Johns Hopkins Hospital, followed by a retina fellowship at Hopkins. She was appointed the first female Chief Resident at Wilmer in 1986.

Career 
Haller became the inaugural Katharine Graham Professor of Ophthalmology at Wilmer Eye Institute in 2002. She also became the first holder of the Robert Bond Welch, M.D. Professorship of Ophthalmology there in 2006. At Wilmer, she directed the Retina Fellowship Training Program from 2001 to 2007.

In 2007, she became the Ophthalmologist-in-Chief of Wills Eye Hospital and co-director of the Wills Vision Research Center at Jefferson. She also is an attending surgeon at Children's Hospital of Philadelphia in the Division of Ophthalmology.

Haller is a member of the National Academy of Medicine, numerous international scientific advisory boards, and sits on the Board of Trustees of the Association of University Professors of Ophthalmology (AUPO), the College of Physicians of Philadelphia, and the Society of Heed Fellows. She is former president of the Women in Medicine Legacy Foundation. Haller joined the Board of Directors of CelgeneIn 2015 and Outlook Therapeutics in 2022.

She serves on the Board of the Johns Hopkins Medical and Surgical Association, and the Philadelphia Orchestra, and is a past member of the Board of Trustees of Princeton University.

Awards and honors
Her honors include:

Lifetime Mentorship Award, Vit-Buckle Society, March 2022
Member, National Academy of Medicine, 2019
Philadelphia Inquirer's "Physician of the Year," August 2019
Women Inc.'s 2018 "Most Influential Corporate Directors"
American Academy of Ophthalmology EnergEYES Award, 2018
ARVO Gold Fellow, Association for Research in Vision and Ophthalmology, 2015
J. Donald M. Gass Medal for Outstanding Achievement in Macula Disease, The Macula Society, 2015
Louis Braille Award, Associated Services for the Blind, 2014
Heed-Gutman Award, Society of Heed Fellows, 2013
American Academy of Ophthalmology (AAO) Life Achievement Honor Award, 2011
AAO Senior Achievement Award
Vitreous Society Senior Honor Award
Kreissig Award from EURETINA, 2008
Gertrude Pyron Award from the Retina Research Foundation and the American Society of Retina Specialists, 2010

Publications 
Haller has published over 400 scientific articles and book chapters.

References

Year of birth missing (living people)
Living people
American ophthalmologists
Princeton University alumni
Harvard Medical School faculty
Thomas Jefferson University faculty
Bryn Mawr School people
Women ophthalmologists
Harvard Medical School alumni
Members of the National Academy of Medicine